The African Cup of Champions Clubs 1971 was the 7th edition of the annual international club football competition held in the CAF region (Africa), the African Cup of Champions Clubs. It determined that year's club champion of association football in Africa.

The tournament was played by 25 teams and used a knock-out format with ties played home and away. Canon Yaoundé from Cameroon won the final, and became CAF club champion for the first time.

First round

|}

Second round

|}
1 Young Africans withdrew. 
2 Espérance de Tunis withdrew.

Quarter-finals

|}

Semi-finals

|}

Final

For the final, only points aggregate, not goals aggregate was considered.

1

Champion

Top scorers
The top scorers from the 1971 African Cup of Champions Clubs are as follows:

External links
African Cup of Champions results at Rec.Sport.Soccer Statistics Foundation

1971 in African football
African Cup of Champions Clubs